Shalom is the third album by The Rabbis' Sons and contained the only Sephardic melody they would ever record (D’ror Yikra). Harachaman would become one of the group's most popular songs. To make up for the lack of the vocal presence of Sharfman and Weinberger, many songs contain overdubbed harmonies of separate vocals by Michael Zheutlin.

Track listing

References

External links 
 Shalom at FAU Jewish Sound Archives
 Shalom at DJSA (Free registration)

1970 albums
Hasidic music
Jewish music albums